Ashley Lauren Baker (born 15 March 1990) is an English soccer goalkeeper. She played for Sky Blue FC in the National Women's Soccer League (NWSL).

Club career
English FA WSL club Lincoln Ladies announced that they had agreed to sign Baker in October 2012, but the transfer fell through when Lincoln later signed Karen Bardsley.

Instead, Baker joined Sky Blue FC in 2013 after being drafted from University of Georgia. She made her debut on 1 June 2013 against Boston Breakers, in which she saved a penalty kick from compatriot Lianne Sanderson in stoppage time. In August 2013 Baker was waived by Sky Blue, who needed the roster space to sign Ashley Nick.

International career
She was part of the England U-19 for the 2008 and 2009 edition of the UEFA Women's Under-19 Championship. She was also involved in the 2008 and 2010 edition of the FIFA U-20 Women's World Cup.

In July 2013 Baker helped Great Britain to a gold medal in the 2013 Summer Universiade in Kazan, Russia.

Honours

International
England U-19
Winner
 UEFA Women's Under-19 Championship: 2009

References

External links
 
 Profile at skybluefc.com
 Profile at soccerdonna.de 

1990 births
Living people
People from Grantham
English women's footballers
NJ/NY Gotham FC players
England women's under-23 international footballers
Georgia Bulldogs women's soccer players
National Women's Soccer League players
NJ/NY Gotham FC draft picks
Women's association football goalkeepers
Universiade gold medalists for Great Britain
Universiade medalists in football
Medalists at the 2013 Summer Universiade